Vernonia dewildemania is a species of plant in the family Asteraceae. It is native to Zambia and the Democratic Republic of the Congo.

References 

dewildemania
Flora of Zambia
Flora of the Democratic Republic of the Congo